Fath-360 (Persian: فتح-۳۶۰), also known as BM-120, is an Iranian short-range satellite-guided tactical ballistic missile announced on the Islamic Republic of Iran Army Day, April 18, 2022.

With  of range, each can carry a  warhead and be launched with the speed of Mach 3 (1020 m/s). Then they connect to satellites for rapid homing and hit their targets with the speed of Mach 4 (1361 m/s).

Design 

It is believed that Fath-360 is a shorter version of Fateh family of SRBMs. Its light weight and small dimensions allow several of these missiles to be put on a truck-based launcher.

Missile 
Fath-360 Missile was first shown under the name of Fath in a military exhibition on August 21, 2020. As a family of Fateh SRBMs, it is almost half the size of a Fateh-110 But has the same configuration of fins. Four at the end of it near the exhaust, four other triangular shaped fins just above them and four small ones in front of missile near the nosecone.

Launcher 
The missile is launched through a round launch container on a truck-based TEL. The Fath-360 launcher comes with two, three, four or six-round launch containers each carrying one missile. with these characteristics it can act like a GMLRS.

Guidance 
Fath-360 uses GNSS guidance and is believed to be using GLONASS satellite navigation system as its guidance. The missile is also believed to be using INS as a secondary guidance system.

Operators 
 
 Islamic Republic of Iran Army Ground Forces
 Islamic Revolutionary Guard Corps Ground Forces

Operational history 
Fath-360 was first test fired during the Eghtedar 1401 military drills at Nasrabad, Isfahan.

Reports also say that Fath-360 has been used to attack the positions of KDPI in Northern Iraq on September 28, 2022.See 2022 Koya bombings.

References 

Tactical ballistic missiles of Iran